Aliabad-e Bezindar (also Romanized as ‘Alīābād-e Bezīndar; also known as ‘Alīābād) is a village in Naran Rural District, in the Central District of Sanandaj County, Kurdistan Province, Iran. At the 2006 census, its population was 31, in 9 families. The village is populated by Kurds.

References 

Towns and villages in Sanandaj County
Kurdish settlements in Kurdistan Province